Goulet is a former commune in the Orne department in north-western of France. On 1 January 2018, it was merged into the new commune of Monts-sur-Orne.

Demographics

See also
 Communes of the Orne department

References

Former communes of Orne